Josiah Thomas   (1760 - 1820) was Archdeacon of Bath from his installation on 26 April 1817 until his death on 27 May 1820.

Thomas was educated at St John's College, Cambridge. He was ordained deacon on 22 September 1782 and priest on 20 June 1784. He held incumbencies at St Merryn, Street, Somerset, Backwell, Kingston Deverill and Walcot, Bath.

Notes

1820 deaths
1760 births
Alumni of St John's College, Cambridge
Archdeacons of Bath